Margaret Ann Nolan (29 October 1943 – 5 October 2020) was an English actress, visual artist and glamour model. She appeared in Goldfinger, A Hard Day's Night and six Carry On films, and also regularly appeared on screen from the 1960s to the 1980s.

Early life
Nolan was born in Hampstead, London. Her mother Molly (née O'Sullivan) was an English nurse and her father Jack was an Irish army clerk. They spent the duration of the Second World War in County Waterford in Ireland until the war ended in 1945 before returning to Hampstead. Nolan began training as a teacher but began dating Tom Kempinski, who was acting with the National Theatre Company at the time, who persuaded her to begin a career in acting.

Career

Modelling career
Margaret Nolan began her career as a model. As her glamour modelling career took off, she was briefly known as Vicky Kennedy in the early 1960s.

Acting career
Nolan reverted to her birth name as soon as she began to find acting roles, appearing in numerous television shows, theatre productions and films. The latter included A Hard Day's Night with the Beatles, Ferry Cross the Mersey with Gerry and the Pacemakers, and Marcel Carné's Three Rooms in Manhattan. Nolan also appeared in one of the first episodes of the television spy thriller The Saint with Roger Moore.

Nolan played the role of Dink, Bond's masseuse, in the James Bond film Goldfinger released in 1964. She was also painted gold and wore a gold bikini for Robert Brownjohn's title-sequence, advertisements and soundtrack-cover (not Shirley Eaton as in the narrative of the film). This led to photographs in Playboy magazine's James Bond's Girls edition of November 1965. In the film Carry On at Your Convenience (1971), composer Eric Rogers referenced Nolan's Goldfinger affiliation by using its three-note motif on a close-up of her. Nolan appeared on the front cover of both the US and UK versions of the 2005 book Robert Brownjohn: Sex and Typography. In 2012, Nolan gave her first interview concerning her experiences as the model. Asked if the imagery liberates or celebrates womanhood, Nolan responded that:It does celebrate the physical form. If I'd been nude it might have been about liberation because up to that point you wouldn't have seen a nude woman in a publicly visible thing like that. I could have been very pretentious and said this is liberating. But because I was dressed-up anyway I didn't get that sense. It became the first film-title to be shown in installation at MoMA, New York (2012).

On appearing in Michael Pertwee's farce She's Done It Again at London's Garrick Theatre in 1969, Nolan was described as combining "a long list of physical attractions with a talent that has contributed to the success of many films and television plays". She was known for five BBC series with Spike Milligan and in 2013 published a short essay on her time working with him. Nolan gave a live reading of the work at the Poetry Society in Covent Garden, reviewed by What's On London as a "deeply-personal memoir... her performance simply magical." She spoke of her awareness of Milligan's depressive character but also of their friendly working relationship; noting that "Professionally, he taught me that timing is what makes things funny. Timing is crucial." Nolan was cast in several Carry On films including Carry On Girls (1973). The film contains the scene of Nolan (in a silver bikini) and Barbara Windsor cat-fighting on a hotel floor.

Nolan also appeared in serious theatre, motivated by political themes. In 2011, Nolan's work as a comedy actress was recognised with her name included on Gordon Young's Comedy Carpet installation in front of Blackpool Tower. Also in 2011, Nolan returned to the screen after a gap of nearly three decades. She starred in a role especially written for her by Ann Cameron, in Yvonne Deutschman's The Power of Three.

In 2019, Edgar Wright cast her in his 2021 film Last Night in Soho. It was Nolan's final film appearance.

Art career
In 1991, Nolan moved to Andalusia in Spain to a rural farmhouse in the mountains where she practiced permaculture. It was here that she became a visual artist.

As a visual artist, Nolan produced graphic and sometimes grotesque photo-montages assembled from cut-outs of her early publicity photographs. These pieces concern "a unique and personal dialogue intrinsically related to a view of a woman and how a woman is viewed." She exhibited in London at venues including the Brick Lane Gallery (2009), The Misty Moon Gallery (2013) and Gallery Different (2013), whilst a screen-print is held by Kemistry Gallery. In 2007, Nolan moved back to London.

In 2009, early publicity shots of Nolan inspired screen-prints by Brighton-based graffiti artist Hutch. Nolan's work in photo-montage was also selected for the front cover of Playerist poetry magazine (No. 2, 2012). In 2013, her artworks featured in the group show equals: exploring feminism through art and conversation at Blankspace Manchester; the press release quoting that: "Her voice carries alongside universal debate on socio-sexual hierarchies in the age of mass media."

Personal life and death
Nolan was married to English playwright Tom Kempinski in 1967 and divorced in 1972. She had two sons.

Nolan died of cancer on 5 October 2020 at her home in Belsize Park, London, at age 76, three weeks before her 77th birthday. She had sought to write a memoir with Paul Stenning.

Filmography
Nolan's acting career covers works in television and cinema.

Film

Television

Theatre

References

Bibliography
 Hadoke, T (2020) Margaret Nolan obituary Guardian Media Group 
 King, E (2005) Robert Brownjohn: Sex and Typography 1925–1970 UK: King . US: Princeton 
 Mele, C (2020) Margaret Nolan, ‘Goldfinger’ Actress, Dies at 76 The New York Times Company 
 Ross, R (1996) The Carry On Companion Batsford 
 Ross, R (1999) 'Carry On' Uncensored Boxtree 
 Ross, R (2011) 'Carry On' Actors Apex 
 Sheridan, R (2007) Keeping the British End Up: Four Decades of Saucy Cinema Reynolds and Hearn 
 Slidel, M (2012) Margaret Nolan Interview Playerist No. 2, Martin Slidel 
 Snelgrove, K (2008) Official Carry On Facts, Figures and Statistics Apex 
 Webber, R (2008) Fifty Years of Carry On Century

External links

 Margaret Nolan: Official website 
 
 Margaret Nolan 2007 interview at "Den of Geek" website
 Margaret Nolan 2012 interview at "Playerist" website

1943 births
2020 deaths
English female models
English film actresses
English stage actresses
English television actresses
English people of Irish descent
People from Hampstead
20th-century English actresses
21st-century English actresses
Women collage artists
Actresses from London
Deaths from cancer in England
People from Belsize Park